Pincherle is a surname. Notable people with the surname include:

 Salvatore Pincherle (1853–1936), Italian mathematician
 Pincherle derivative, in mathematics
 Marc Pincherle (1888–1974), French musicologist, music critic
 Alberto Pincherle (1907–1990), Italian novelist, better known by his pen name Alberto Moravia

Italian-language surnames
Sephardic surnames